Asambhav (translation: Impossible) is a 2004 Indian Hindi action thriller film directed by Rajiv Rai and produced by Gulshan Rai under Trimurti Films banner. It was released on 23 July 2004, starring Arjun Rampal, Naseeruddin Shah and Priyanka Chopra in the lead roles with Dipannita Sharma, Tom Alter, Milind Gunaji and Sharat Saxena playing supporting roles among others. The film was shot entirely in Switzerland. Upon release, it received mixed-to-positive reviews, but was an average grosser.

Plot
Captain Aditya "Adit" Arya (Arjun Rampal) is a special agent of the Indian army. The Indian president Veer Pratap Singh (Mohan Agashe) is kidnapped by Rafiq Mabroz (Shawar Ali) in exchange for cash rewarded by renowned terrorist Youssan Baksh (Mukesh Rishi) and General Ansari (Milind Gunaji). Adit is sent undercover to rescue the president and his daughter, Kinjal (Dipannita Sharma).

The mission is coded "Asambhav". Adit poses as a journalist for Indiatimes and makes his way to Switzerland with the help of a RAW agent called Atul Bhatnagar (Jameel Khan). On the flight, Adit meets Alisha (Priyanka Chopra). Alisha is a singer and has come to Switzerland to do a show with Sam Hans (Naseeruddin Shah). Her friend Shilpa (Chitrita Sharma) accompanies her. However, the people whom Alisha and Shilpa have come to Switzerland with are drug smugglers. Shilpa is murdered when she finds this out, and Alisha pretends she knows nothing but meets Adit for help. Adit and Alisha fall in love.

Adit links events from Shilpa's murder to the president's kidnapping and sees that Sam Hans, General Ansari, Youssan Baksh, and Rafiq Mabroz are involved together. Hans' friend Ranjit Parmar (Yashpal Sharma), of the Indian embassy, checks files of Switzerland and learns Rafiq Mabroz is a terrorist. He informs Hans, and Hans decides to fight ISI. However, he signs a deal with ISI by kidnapping the president from Youssan Baksh and returning the president to Baksh in the exchange offer of 50 million pounds.

Parmar suspects someone at the Indian embassy is a traitor helping terrorists. He finds out that Ms. Brar (Tora Khasgir) is a traitor. He informs ambassador G.L. Sarin (Sharat Saxena) and is knocked out by Mabroz. Parmar awakes to discover that Ms. Brar and Sarin are both traitors and are associates of Mabroz. Mabroz kills Parmar, and Sarin leaves a suicide note beside Parmar. Capt. Arya and Bhatnagar find Parmar dead by the note, but Arya reveals that the ambassador is the traitor because of his head-stamp on the suicide note. Arya tries to finish Sarin, but Brar calls the police to get Arya and the ambassadors arrested. Arya shows the police his army card while Sarin and Brar flee. Arya chases them, and Gazi (Chetan Hansraj) tries to attack Arya. Arya runs after Gazi and is attacked by ISI agents and Youssan's men in a fort. They try to kill Arya, but Arya fires back and kills all of them, including Gazi.

Adit reaches Youssan's headquarters, to free the president. He kills General Ansari and all of Youssan's men. Youssan takes the president and flees. Adit chases him. Sam has captured Alisha and Kinjal but is stopped by Ambassador Sarin, who has Hans' friend Brian as a captive. Hans gives money to free Brian, but Sarin kills Brian. Hans kills Mabroz's men. Ms. Brar and Volga (Anupama Verma) chase Alisha and Kinjal near a helicopter but kill each other in the crossfire. Sarin tries to finish Hans, but Hans kills him to avenge the death of Brian.

Youssan tries to kill the president, but Adit kills Youssan and saves him. Mabroz tries to shoot Adit, but Adit kills him. In the end, Adit meets Sam, who confesses sins he committed but promises to improve; so they become friends after being arch rivals throughout the Mission Asambhav. Adit goes back to India with his girlfriend Alisha, Kinjal, the president and Atul Bhatnagar.

Cast
Arjun Rampal In a dual role as 
Captain Aditya Arya:He is a para-commando. His objective is to save the president from the Al-Amaz terrorist group led by Youssan Baksh.
Qazi: A look-alike of Aditya who is in the Al-Amaz terrorist group
Priyanka Chopra as Alisha
She is the love interest of Adit. Alisha is a struggling singer from India. She is trapped by Dabral, Sam Hans and Brian in a drug smuggling plan, and she seeks Adit for help.
Naseeruddin Shah as Sameer "Sam" Hans
He is very important for the movie. Sam is a rich drug dealer. He is originally from Delhi, but he resides in Switzerland.
Dipannita Sharma as Kinjal
She is the bright daughter of the president. Kinjal studies at a university in the USA.
Mohan Agashe as president Veer Pratap Singh
He is a man with wisdom. He is supposed to be relaxing in Switzerland, but is kidnapped by Mabroz. He is freed from Mabroz, but then kidnapped by Sam Hans, who sells the president to Youssan, before finally being saved by Captain Adit Arya.
Yashpal Sharma as Ranjit Parmar
He is a member of the Indian Embassy in Switzerland. He has unintentionally passed the tender to Rafiq Mabroz for the vacations of the Indian president, for which he is upset. He informs his friend Sam Hans about the situation as well as the Indian Embassy. However, Embassy members G.L. Sarin and Ms. Brar are revealed to be Mabroz's allies and traitors of the country, during which Mabroz kills Parmar.
Tom Alter as Brian
He is the influence of Sam Hans. Brian is responsible for involving Alisha in the drugs smuggling. He is killed by G.L. Sarin, after being held at ransom for Sam Hans' money.
Jameel Khan as Atul Bhatnagar
He is a RAW agent, who is sent by the Indian army to fulfill the needs of Captain Adit during the mission.
Chitrita Sharma as Shilpa
She is Alisha's friend. She is murdered by Gazi.
Milind Gunaji as General Ansari
Ansari is an ISI agent from Pakistan. He is a powerful man with contacts. He arranged an attempt on Sam Hans's life, and he has contacts in Al Jazeera. He is a clever man and keeps a cool head for most of the time. He is shot and killed by Adit.
Tej Sapru as Hashmi
He is an ISI agent. Hashmi is the first of the two henchmen of General Ansari. He is killed as he attempts to apprehend Bhatnager.
Chetan Hansraj as Gazi
He is an ISI agent. Gazi is second of the two henchmen of General Ansari. He kills Alisha's friend Shilpa, and lures Adit into a trap created by Ansari. He is killed by Adit.
Sharat Saxena as G.L. Sarin
He is the Indian ambassador. A seemingly proud Indian at first, until turning out to be a traitor. He kills Sam Hans's friend Brian, and is killed by Hans in return.
Tora Khasgir as Ms. Tanya Brar
She is an associate to the Indian Ambassador G.L. Sarin. Ms. Tanya Brar is revealed as a traitor, working for Rafiq Mabroz and is working alongside Sarin for the huge fee paid by the ISI. She is accidentally killed by Volga, after both women try to kill Alisha and Kinjal, who dodges the attack.
Mukesh Rishi as Youssan Baksh
He is the leader of the Al Amaz insurgency. Baksh is a clever man, as he discovers an Indian spy in his group. As well as smarts, he has strength. He is killed by Captain Adit Arya in the final scenes of Asambhav.
Shawar Ali as Rafiq Mabroz
He is an international terrorist whose purpose is similar to a mercenary. Whilst Youssan and Ansari are patriots, Mabroz cares only for the money. He is responsible for the death of Embassy worker Parmar.
Arif Zakaria as Dabral
Dabral is an associate of Brian's. He discovers Alisha and is one of the few people who actually know who Aditya is, and what relationship he has with Alisha. Dabral is killed by Zorba.
Anupama Verma as Volga
She is a lady in Rafiq Mabroz's gang. She is the love interest of Mabroz.
Shabhir Ali as Zorba
He is a man in Rafiq Mabroz's gang.
Mumaith Khan as Dancer in the song "Mashuqa Rubiya" (Special Appearance)

Production

Development
In 2002, Rai planned to shift to the action thriller genre after Pyaar Ishq Aur Mohabbat. In an interview with Filmfare Online, Rai said, "I listened to several people's opinions. I made the film ('PIAM') not on intuition and belief but on marketing strategies and counsels from trade persons insisting that love stories were the trend of the day." In that same year, Rai started his new project with a comeback to action genre and titled it Asambhav.

Casting

After planning Asambhav, Rai signed Arjun Rampal as the hero of the movie as Rampal had worked as the hero of Rai's previous directorial venture Pyaar Ishq Aur Mohabbat. Aishwarya Rai was signed as the heroine. Rampal and Rai were in Dil Ka Rishta that released on 17 January 2003 and Asambhav marked their second pairing. However, Rai backed out in 2003, and Priyanka Chopra was cast in as the female lead.

Naseeruddin Shah was recruited to essay the role of the villain as he had worked with Rai as a hero in Tridev and as a villain in Mohra. Shah had earned critical acclaim for his villainous performance in Rai's Mohra and had earned a nomination for Filmfare Award for Best Performance in a Negative Role at the 40th Filmfare Awards. Noticing on Shah's previous success in a negative role, Rai cast him as the villain in his latest action thriller. The total cast was of 55 artists including model turned actress Dipannita Sharma, Tom Alter and Sharat Saxena among others.

During the music launch, Rajiv Rai was interviewed on casting models in important roles. He said, "I wanted a very western look to the film; I wanted it to look stylish. I have roped in many models because I wanted my film to look fresh and stylish. Models have a lot of exposure, and they are very confident in front of the camera. There are a lot of fresh faces coming into acting. I wanted fresh faces for my film. The modeling industry can act. It's not fair to pinpoint. Arjun (Rampal) himself was a model."

Filming
After the casting was finalised, Rajiv Rai flew to Switzerland, and the film was shot in Ticino. He began filming in June 2003 with a schedule of 57 days. It was filmed in a multi-camera setup. While most scenes were shot with four cameras, the action sequences consisted of seven camera units. It was the first Indian action film to feature no stunts. The action sequences were digitally shot. Asambhav was the first Indian film to be graded digitally on Luster. Filming was completed in September 2003. It was the first Indian movie to be shot in that location, in the longest filming schedule of any Indian film unit in Switzerland. Asambhav was digitised, and no duplicates were used in its development.

Post-production
Asambhav was launched in March 2004. The soundtrack was composed by Viju Shah and it was launched in Mumbai on 26 May 2004.

Release
Asambhav was released on 23 July 2004. First 15 minutes of the film aired on Star Gold a day prior to film's release.

Critical reception

Asambhav received mixed to positive reviews from critics upon release. Ronjita Kulkarni of Rediff wrote "Asambhav, starring Arjun Rampal and Priyanka Chopra, is a good film. It packs in the done-to-death Pak-bashing content, and reduces Pakistanis and Afghans to caricatures." Prema K. of Bollyvista wrote "The film grip the audience even in a single reel. The songs flow freely. Viju Shah too seems to have lost his touch! The cinematography is good, in fact, the only real good thing about the film. Arjun Rampal is good, but the role does not offer him much scope. Priyanka Chopra is reduced to a glamorous piece. The model brigade serves as mere sidekicks. Talented actors like Naseeruddin Shah, and Arif Zakaria have been positive." Taran Adarsh of Bollywood Hungama gave a rating of 3.5 out of 5 stars and gave positive reviews. He wrote, "On the whole, ASAMBHAV is a medium film in all respects. At the box-office, its chances of hit movie asambhav [impossible]." Shahid Khan of Planet Bollywood gave a rating of 8 out of 10 stars. He wrote, "Rajiv Rai's direction is uninspired. Therefore, his "Asambhav" ends up looking tired and dragged out."

Nitika Desai of Apun Ka Choice gave a rating of 3 out of 5 stars. She wrote, "'Asambhav' is a film that sticks to the beaten and worn-out Bollywood stereotypes. Over-dramatic dialogues, deliberately forced songs, and inflated action sequences make it quite a predictable and stodgy fare." Subhash K. Jha of IANS wrote "Asambhav is arguably the only mainstream film ever with no mother-figure on the hectic horizon. But the absence of melodrama cannot in itself be a virtue unless it is compounded by a moist quality in the overall design of storytelling."

Pankaj Shukla of SmasHits praised the movie but criticised the casting. He wrote, "The film in totality is not boring. It not only entertains but also makes value for the money, as the labor done by the director is quite visible on the screen. It is only the casting of the film that has gone haywire."

Box office

India
It collected 80,632,076 rupees in the opening weekend from all over the country. The earning in the following week was it 100,507,694 in the second week and 220,731,569 in the third week. It grossed a total of 500,113,339. As a result, it was declared an average grosser.

International
The film collected US$19,504 in the United States. In the United Kingdom, the film hit fifteen screens in the first weekend of 23 July and collected £16,894. In the second weekend of 30 July, the screens were reduced to fourteen. Asambhav collected £2,142 and grossed a total of £30,311 in the first two weekends. It was declared an average grosser.

Soundtrack

The soundtrack of Asambhav was recorded in 2003. It was composed by Viju Shah. It was released by the Tips Music Films label on 14 April 2004. The lyrics were written by Sameer, and Remo D'Souza was the choreographer of the music sequences. The soundtrack was released on 14 April 2004.

The soundtrack consisted of eleven tracks, including five songs, five instrumental versions and a special 'Asambhav Theme'. The director Rajiv Rai and the supporting actor Naseeruddin Shah also sang in the movie. They performed the song 'Raatein Badi Hain'.

The soundtrack received mixed to negative reviews. Shahid Khan of Planet Bollywood rated it 7 out of 10 stars. He wrote, "Viju Shah´s "Asambhav" might not exactly win the award for the best soundtrack of the year, but there are some pretty darn good tunes here." Runaq Kotecha of Glamsham wrote "The music of Asambhav once again confirms that Viju Shah is certainly one of the best composers that we have when it comes to delivering expeditious racy tracks with ultra modern electronic beats. However, in the midst of all the upbeat technology and heavy duty musical instruments, the tunes seem to be taking a back seat." Aira of SmasHits wrote "Music of 'Asambhav' is only mediocre. If heard in isolation, the music lovers will probably be interested in the techno bit of the entire album."

Awards and nominations
Zee Cine Awards
Zee Cine Award for Best Song Recording–Tanay Gajjar (nominated)

References

External links
 
 

2004 films
2004 action thriller films
2000s spy thriller films
2000s Hindi-language films
Indian action thriller films
Films about intelligence agencies
Indian spy thriller films
India–Pakistan relations in popular culture
Trimurti Films
Films scored by Viju Shah
Films shot in Switzerland
Military of Pakistan in films
Films directed by Rajiv Rai